Chak No. 104 SB is a village in Sargodha District in Punjab, Pakistan. Its neighboring villages are Chak No. 108, 109, & 142 SB and 49 NB. This chak is situated at Faisalabad Road, and Jhang Bypass, near 49 Tail.  This village was an agricultural area but now people have the trend towards personal businesses. Chak No. 104 SB's another most prominent feature is that it is situated in lap of Kirana Hills of Sargodha and on the other side it has Pakistan Air Base.

Facilities
The village has Sargodha medical college, a girls' degree college, boys' high school, girls' high school, girls' primary school, veterinary hospital, mini supermarkets, car service stations, petrol and diesel suppliers, model Janzagah and playgrounds. The nearest city is Sargodha which is the district headquarters and police station. 

Populated places in Sargodha District